Jean Saulnier, was a 14th-century knight, lord of Thoury-sur-Abron, councilor and chamberlain of the king of France, steward of Isabeau, duchess of Bourbonnais, and bailiff of Saint-Pierre-le-Moûtier.

He died in 1389.

References

14th-century French people
1389 deaths